In Deep is a collection of eight science fiction short stories by American writer Damon Knight. The stories were originally published between 1951 and 1960 in The Magazine of Fantasy and Science Fiction, Rogue and other magazines.

The book contains the short story "The Country of the Kind", considered by many to be Knight's finest.

The story "The Handler" was omitted from British editions of the book.

Contents
 "Four in One"
 "An Eye for a What?"
 "The Handler"
 "Stranger Station"
 "Ask Me Anything"
 "The Country of the Kind"
 "Ticket to Anywhere"
 "Beachcomber"

1963 short story collections
Science fiction short story collections
Works by Damon Knight